William Andonia Truban (October 6, 1924 – February 3, 2007) was a veterinarian who served more than two decades as a Republican in the Virginia Senate, representing Shenandoah, Clarke, Frederick and Loudoun Counties and the city of Winchester, Virginia, and sometimes Fauquier and Warren counties as well. Dr. Truban was then Senate minority leader of what was then a small party as the Byrd Organization disintegrated.

Early life

William Truban was born in the unincorporated town of Gormania in Garrett County, Maryland on October 6, 1924 to Joseph Truban and his wife May Parks. He was single and classified as a gardener or groundskeeper when he registered for the draft upon turning 18. Truban was inducted into the U.S. Army in Baltimore, Maryland, on March 15, 1943.  He served in the U.S. Army Air Force in the Asian Theater during World War II,

He used the G.I. Bill at West Virginia Wesleyan College in Buckhannon, West Virginia from which he received a bachelor's degree. He earned his veterinary degree (V.M.D.) from the University of Pennsylvania School of Veterinary Medicine in Philadelphia, Pennsylvania. He married Mildred Jean Hayes and was a member of the United Methodist Church.

Career
Truban established Shenandoah Animal Hospital in Woodstock, Shenandoah County, Virginia and was active in the Veterinary Medical Association as well as the Woodstock Rotary Club. His son Thomas S. Truban later took over the veterinary practice.

Political career
Truban won a special election in 1970 after J. Kenneth Robinson, who had represented the then-rural 27th District in the Virginia Senate as a Republican, won election to the U.S. House of Representatives. Dr. Truban won 61% of the votes cast in that election and handily defeated Democrat Robert Smalley. Four years later, he defeated Democrat Thelma T. Ore by a similar margin, although in 1979 Truban won re-election with a mere 56.9% of votes cast while running against Democrat Donald W. Patterson Jr. Dr. Truban faced no opposition in his 1983 nor 1987 campaigns for re-election and announced his retirement before the 1991 primary.

Dr. Truban served as the sole Republican on the Senate Finance Committee and as Senate minority leader until November 1991. While he was the Republican floor leader, his party held no more than 10 of the Senate’s 40 seats;  Republicans later became the majority party. Dr. Truban helped establish a veterinary school at Virginia Tech, which became the Virginia-Maryland Regional College of Veterinary Medicine. A fiscal conservative as had been both his long-serving predecessor Democrats Harry F. Byrd Sr. and Harry F. Byrd Jr., Truban sat on the Joint Legislative Audit and Review Commission (JLARC) which in 1990 proposed establishing a state cash reserve to protect Virginia’s bond rating and keep the state on firm financial footing during economic downturns. Although the proposal initially failed, voters ratified the Virginia Revenue Stabilization Fund, better known as the rainy-day fund, in 1992, and it became law in 1993.

Later years

Truban continued his veterinary practice, but when health issues accumulated, he entered an assisted living facility in Woodstock, Virginia. There he died on February 3, 2007, survived by his widow and six children, as well as grandchildren. One of his sons, William A. Truban Jr., became a lawyer and established legal practice specializing in elder law.

References

1924 births
2007 deaths
American veterinarians
Male veterinarians
Republican Party Virginia state senators
West Virginia Wesleyan College alumni
University of Pennsylvania School of Veterinary Medicine alumni
People from Garrett County, Maryland
People from Woodstock, Virginia
20th-century American politicians